Sarah Kent (born 10 February 1990) is an Australian female  track cyclist. She won the bronze medal in the team pursuit event at the 2009 UCI Track Cycling World Championships. She also competed in at the 2010 and 2011 UCI Track Cycling World Championships.

References

External links
 
 
 

1990 births
Living people
Australian track cyclists
Australian female cyclists
Place of birth missing (living people)
20th-century Australian women
21st-century Australian women